A Young Doctor's Notebook (Russian: «» Zapiski yunogo vracha, literally, "A Young Doctor's Notes"), also known as A Country Doctor's Notebook, is a short story cycle by the Russian writer Mikhail Bulgakov. The stories written in 1925–1926 and inspired by Bulgakov's experiences as a newly graduated young doctor in 1916-18, practicing in a small village hospital in Smolensk Governorate in revolutionary Russia. The stories initially appeared in Russian medical journals of the period and were later compiled by scholars into book form. 

The first English translation was done by Michael Glenny and was published by Harvill Press in 1975. A more recent translation (2011) has been done by Hugh Aplin under the Oneworld Classics imprint. The title of the Aplin translation is A Young Doctor's Notebook.

Stories
 "The Towel with a Cockerel Motif" (translated by Michael Glenny as "The Embroidered Towel")
 "Baptism by Version" (translated by Michael Glenny as "Baptism by Rotation")
 "The Steel Throat" (translated by Michael Glenny as "The Steel Windpipe")
 "The Blizzard"
 "Egyptian Darkness" (translated by Michael Glenny as "Black as Egypt's Night")
 "The Missing Eye" (translated by Michael Glenny as "The Vanishing Eye")
 "The Star Rash" (translated by Michael Glenny as "The Speckled Rash" and by Hugh Aplin as "The Starry Rash")

The Michael Glenny translation includes the short stories "The Murderer" (1926) and "Morphine" (1927) which are not included in the original cycle. The Hugh Aplin translation also includes "Morphine" but does not include "The Murderer".

Adaptations
In 2008, a Russian film adaptation, titled Morphine, was released. 
In 2012, the book was turned into a television miniseries with the same title and broadcast by Sky Arts as a part of the anthology series strand, Playhouse Presents. The role of the narrator/doctor is played by Jon Hamm and Daniel Radcliffe, both fans of Bulgakov's works. The show also features Adam Godley (as the feldsher Demyan Lukich), Vicki Pepperdine, Rosie Cavaliero and Paul Popplewell.

References

External links

 
 Entry on FantLab 

Russian short story collections
Works by Mikhail Bulgakov
1926 short story collections
1963 short story collections
Medicine and health in fiction